Todor Stoyanov (6 July 1930 – 30 April 1999) was a Bulgarian film director and cinematographer. He directed ten films between 1967 and 1990. His 1967 film Detour was entered into the 5th Moscow International Film Festival where it won the Special Golden Prize and the Prix FIPRESCI.

Selected filmography
 The Peach Thief (1964)
 Detour (1967)

References

External links

1930 births
1999 deaths
Bulgarian film directors
Bulgarian cinematographers
Film people from Sofia